Devon Durrell Dotson (born August 2, 1999) is an American professional basketball player for the Capital City Go-Go of the NBA G League. He played college basketball for the Kansas Jayhawks.

High school career
Dotson attended Providence Day School in Charlotte, North Carolina, along with Grant Williams and Joshua Howard, graduating in 2018. During his senior year of high school, Dotson averaged 28.5 points, 6.8 rebounds, and 5.1 assists, leading the school to its sixth conference title. Devon scored 2,607 points becoming the school's all-time leader in points. Devon was a 4 Time All-Conference and 3 Time All-State Selection. He was also a 2-time Charlotte Observer All-Mecklenburg boys' basketball player of the year. Devon ended his high school career by being selected and playing in the 2018 McDonald's All-American Game held in Atlanta, Georgia.

Recruiting
On October 13, 2017, Dotson committed to playing college basketball at the University of Kansas, choosing the Jayhawks over offers from UCLA, Maryland, Florida, UNC, and other schools.

College career
As a freshman, Dotson began the season as the Jayhawks starting point guard playing national ranked Michigan State Spartans in the 2018 Champions Classic on November 6, 2018. In his first collegiate game, Dotson pitched in 16 points and three steals, showcasing his quickness with a number of layups. Dotson was on the watch list for the 2019 Bob Cousy Point Guard of the Year Award, the Naismith Memorial Basketball Hall of Fame announced on October 15, 2018.

In his 2018–19 freshman season, Dotson averaged 12.3 points, 3.7 rebounds, 3.5 assists, and 1.4 steals a game while shooting 36.3% from three-point territory.  On February 11, 2019, Dotson led the Jayhawks to a win in overtime against the TCU Horned Frogs in Fort Worth, Texas, by scoring 25 points, grabbing 10 rebounds, and passing for 5 assists with 6 turnovers in 45 minutes of playing time. On February 13, 2019, Dotson was named national freshman of the week by CBS Sports and the U.S. Basketball Writers Association for his play in the TCU game among others.

During his sophomore season, Dotson scored a career-high 31 points in a 90–84 overtime win over Dayton on November 27. He was named co-MVP of the Maui Jim Maui Invitational and was named Big 12 player of the week on December 2. Dotson missed a game against Oklahoma on January 14, 2020, with a hip injury. At the conclusion of the regular season, Dotson was named to the First Team All-Big 12. He averaged 18.1 points, 4.1 rebounds, and 4.0 assists per game as a sophomore. Following the season, he declared for the 2020 NBA draft and hired an agent. After going undrafted, Dotson signed with the Chicago Bulls.

Professional career

Chicago Bulls (2020–2022)
After going undrafted in the 2020 NBA draft, Dotson signed with the Chicago Bulls, on a two-way contract with their NBA G League affiliate, the Windy City Bulls. As the Windy City Bulls opted out of the 2020–21 G League season, Dotson was assigned to the Canton Charge, making his debut in their season opener on February 11, 2021.

On August 19, 2021, the Bulls announced that they had re-signed Dotson to a two-way contract. During the 2021–22 season, Dotson appeared in 11 games with the Bulls and averaged 2.6 points and 1.4 assists per game. On January 16, 2022, he was waived by the Bulls.

Windy City Bulls (2022)
On January 22, 2022, Dotson was re-acquired by the Windy City Bulls. However, he was waived on February 4. Three days later, Dotson was re-acquired by the Bulls.

Capital City Go-Go (2022)
On August 25, 2022, Dotson was traded to the Capital City Go-Go.

Washington Wizards (2022–2023)
On November 20, 2022, Dotson signed a two-way contract with the Washington Wizards. On January 17, 2023, he was waived.

Return to Capital City (2023–present)
On January 19, 2023, Dotson was reacquired by the Capital City Go-Go.

Career statistics

NBA

|-
| style="text-align:left;"| 
| style="text-align:left;"| Chicago
| 11 || 0 || 4.5 || .524 || .143 ||  || .5 || .6 || .4 || .0 || 2.1
|-
| style="text-align:left;"| 
| style="text-align:left;"| Chicago
| 11 || 0 || 7.7 || .478 || .222 || .556 || .8 || 1.4 || .1 || .0 || 2.6
|-
| style="text-align:left;"| 
| style="text-align:left;"| Washington
| 6 || 0 || 8.8 || .100 || .250 ||  || 1.7 || 1.3 || .8 || .0 || .5
|- class="sortbottom"
| style="text-align:center;" colspan="2"| Career
| 28 || 0 || 6.7 || .426 || .200 || .556 || .9 || 1.1 || .4 || .0 || 2.0

College

|-
| style="text-align:left;"| 2018–19
| style="text-align:left;"| Kansas
| 36 || 36 || 32.4 || .482 || .363 || .782 || 3.7 || 3.5 || 1.4 || .1 || 12.3
|-
| style="text-align:left;"| 2019–20
| style="text-align:left;"| Kansas
| 30 || 30 || 34.9 || .468 || .309 || .830 || 4.1 || 4.0 || 2.1 || .1 || 18.1
|- class="sortbottom"
| style="text-align:center;" colspan="2"| Career
|| 66 || 66 || 33.6 || .474 || .332 || .808 || 3.8 || 3.7 || 1.7 || .1 || 14.9

Personal life
Devon was born in Chicago, the son of Dana and Angela Dotson and has two siblings, a brother and a sister. He became interested in basketball as a youngster and later expressed admiration for the playing style of Derrick Rose. Dotson, on occasion, would pattern parts of his game based on that of Rose's by simulating his moves on the court. He also has worn the No. 1 like Rose during Rose's Chicago Bulls playing days.

References

External links
Kansas Jayhawks bio

1999 births
Living people
All-American college men's basketball players
American men's basketball players
Basketball players from Charlotte, North Carolina
Basketball players from Chicago
Canton Charge players
Capital City Go-Go players
Chicago Bulls players
Kansas Jayhawks men's basketball players
McDonald's High School All-Americans
Point guards
Undrafted National Basketball Association players
Washington Wizards players
Windy City Bulls players